Freestyle Music Park, formerly called Hard Rock Park, was a short-lived, music-themed amusement park in Myrtle Beach, South Carolina. It included part of the former Waccamaw Factory Shoppes in Fantasy Harbour, and its headquarters was located in Mall 3.

The park opened to the public on April 15, 2008, but following financial issues, it closed later that year on September 24. It reopened under the Freestyle brand on May 23, 2009, but it closed permanently at the end of the season due to mounting financial problems and lawsuits.

History

Development of Hard Rock Park
Plans for a Hard Rock-themed amusement park were released in 2003, but at the time funding and licensing agreements had yet to be finalized. AVX Corporation CEO Dick Rosen and other investors including Ziel Feldman and Safe Harbor Capital Partners managing partner Amnon Bar-Tur created two companies. Myrtle Property Owners I, which invested in the proposed theme park and Myrtle Property Owners II which bought land from Rosen with the intent to build a hotel along the Intracoastal Waterway in October 2005. A feasibility study predicted 3 million visitors a year in the park's first year, with growth of nine percent the second year and decreasing growth rates after that.

By 2006, a licensing agreement with the Hard Rock franchise was reached. The Hard Rock name was licensed from Seminole Nation–owned Hard Rock International, current owners/operators of the Hard Rock Cafe brand, to HRP Myrtle Beach Operations, LLC, which designed and built the park, for a fee of $2.5 million per year. Investors included Tim Duncan and AVX Corporation CEO Dick Rosen. Financing also included a loan of $385 million, though the park only cost $225 million to build. An early theme was the four seasons of summer, spring, winter and fall.

Hard Rock Park was officially announced in early 2007. Construction for the park took place in 2007.

2008 season: Hard Rock Park
The grand opening celebration as Hard Rock Park on June 2, 2008, featured a concert by Eagles and The Moody Blues. The park featured six "rock environs" celebrating rock's culture, lifestyle, legends and irreverence. These rock environs included the All Access Entry Plaza, Rock & Roll Heaven, British Invasion, Lost in the 70's, Born in the US and Cool Country. At opening, the park had amusement rides, live shows, interactive elements, kids play areas, gardens, shopping and dining attractions. The main attractions of the park were the roller coasters and live shows that were set to music. The park included an amphitheater with 10,000-person capacity featuring live daily shows and special performances. Other amusements included a carousel, a water play structure and swings.  Most attractions prominently featured music, bands, and rock memorabilia like its cafe counterpart.

The park opened to positive reviews. The Times of London's writer Chris Haslam concluded that America's newest theme park brought the genre "from the preschool plastic of Disney to a new age of insubordinate adolescence through a combination of nerdy attention to detail, startling irreverence and sly wit." Beth J. Harpaz, Associated Press travel editor, declared Nights in White Satin: The Trip as one of her all-time favorite rides from any park. However, Hard Rock Park had stated the park could accommodate up to 30,000 visitors a day, and in light of the frozen credit markets during the financial crisis of 2007–2008, the park could not secure sufficient finance to underwrite its planned advertising campaign. As the 2008 economic downturn deepened during the summer, high gas and hotel prices coupled with limited advertising by the park led to lower-than-expected attendance. The park cited "macroeconomic conditions that significantly depressed overall demand in the travel and leisure industry" and a lack of cash to advertise. The park had borrowed a lot of money and could not convince investors to provide more help to keep the park going.

Changes were made to operating hours and planned operating days. The original closing time of 1 a.m. was moved up to 10 p.m. in August and the park moved to weekend-only operations after Labor Day. With an earlier end-of-season planned on November 2, the park scheduled no concerts past August 30.

Early closure, bankruptcy and new owners
In September 2008, HRP investor Africa Israel Investments decided to write off its entire $10 million investment in the park "due to liquidity difficulties the park is experiencing". Hard Rock Park then announced that they were ending the 2008 season over a month early, laying off most of the employees, and had filed for Chapter 11 bankruptcy protection. At the time of the filing, the park expressed hopes of reopening in 2009; the following month the company announced plans to sell the park. In January 2009, the company converted to Chapter 7.

In February 2009, the Delaware bankruptcy court declined to force an auction and approved the sale of the park to FPI MB Entertainment (FPI) for $25 million. FPI MB Entertainment was a joint venture of FPI US LLC, a company incorporated in Delaware, and MB Entertainment. The partners included Roundbox Advisors, Freestyle Park International, Baker Leisure Group, and two of the park's original owners, Thomas M. Hiles and D. Tim Duncan. Baker Leisure Group managed the day-to-day park operations. FPI had to completely re-skin and overhaul the park to comply with court rulings.

On April 2, 2009, the new owners announced that the Hard Rock name would be dropped. While Hard Rock International had been willing to continue use of the name if conditions could be met, the owners felt that changing the name would give the park a more positive image since the old name was connected with the bankruptcy; also, the "Hard Rock" name was not considered family-oriented. Because of the name change, the bankruptcy court required all Hard Rock souvenirs to be destroyed.

Later that month, FPI unveiled a new name for the park: Freestyle Music Park, stating that it would pay homage to a variety of musical genres, including rock n' roll, country, reggae, beach music, pop, R&B, alternative, Christian, disco, and rap. The name does not refer to the Latin music genre, according to sales and marketing director John Stine.

In May 2009, HRP Creative Services Co. wanted to make certain attractions separate from the park the new owners planned, with former park CEO Steven Goodwin wanting the new owners to pay royalties. However, a Delaware federal judge said on March 30 that some of the previous owners still owned intellectual property rights relating to the original theme. The original owners then sued FPI, claiming they had not done enough to change the park, and that the new owners were using intellectual property that was not theirs. This action threatened to delay the reopening.

On June 22, 2009, the county planning commission agreed to change the name of Hard Rock Parkway to Fantasy Harbour Boulevard. FPI agreed to pay part of the cost for new signs. Businesses located on the road would have to pay their own expenses as the road, once called Outlet Boulevard, received its second name change in two years. By mid-September, five of the seven signs on the street itself had been changed.

2009 season: Freestyle Music Park
The park reopened on May 23, 2009, with adult admission reduced to $39.95 ($29.95 for children) and annual passes to $64.95 ($39.95 for children). Additionally, the park offered three separate promotions during the 2009 summer season: $10 off for South Carolina residents, $17.76 for two admission tickets after 4PM and $19.99 for two admission tickets prior to 4PM. As a result of these discounts, the park also made less money than anticipated.

Aside from the renaming of the overall park, sections of the park also got new names; "Myrtle's Beach" (previously "Rock 'N' Roll Heaven") became a "tongue-in-cheek celebration of all things Polynesian,"  "Born in the USA" became "Kids in America," "British Invasion" became "Across the Pond," and "Cool Country" became "Country USA." The entrance changed names from "All Access Entry Plaza" to "VIP Plaza". FPI also introduced Kids in America, a  children's section with four rides named after hit songs purchased from Zamperla of Italy. The rides are named "Get Off My Cloud," "Fly Like an Eagle," "Wheels in the Sky" and "Life Is a Highway." "CSI: Live", previously performed at Six Flags Magic Mountain near Los Angeles, was added to the park and was based on the CSI TV series.

As the park prepared to close at the end of the summer, FPI President Steve Baker said, "Overall, I'm real happy," and that "we're doing our best, and we're here to stay." Baker made these comments despite the fact that the economy and the park's past problems contributed to a less than spectacular first season. Many amusement parks were also having difficulties, said David Mandt of the International Association of Amusement Parks and Attractions. Consultant Dennis Speigel, who had no connection to the park, said, "It's probably the largest catastrophe in our industry. Quite frankly the park shouldn't reopen." He said for the price FPI paid, they should have been able to make the park succeed. Speigel said the park was too far from the beach.

Further problems and subsequent closure
Throughout the season, a series of lawsuits were filed against the park, adding to the park's woes. The lawsuits were filed by Brandon Advertising (for $1.4 million) on August 5, 2009, and Roundbox Advisors LLC (for $360,000) on August 17, 2009. Baker explained that FPI MB would pay both creditors, saying that Freestyle Park had fewer problems than Hard Rock Park, but people were assuming the difficulties would continue, meaning that they were less patient. Tetra Financial Group also filed a lawsuit in September for lease payments, taxes and fees. In October 2009, FPI announced that they had lined up some new investors to help the park pay its debts. They signed a memorandum of understanding with the investors.

The agreement to purchase Hard Rock Park included paying $570,000 owed by the former park owners. In January 2010, the attorney for Hard Rock Park's trustee allowed an extension on that payment as the park searched for new investors. Court documents said the economic situation caused difficulties in making the payments. The park laid off 30 employees early in January 2010.

In February 2010, FPI attorney Tobey Daluz announced that the park would not open in March 2010 as planned. She said when or if the park opened depended on actions of investors who have not been identified. On March 29, 2010, lawyer David Slough said the park would not reopen unless investors allowed FPI to pay Hard Rock Park's debt by the deadline of April 1, 2010. He would not say how close investors were to a deal. On April 1, 2010, Slough said, "Currently, the park has no ability to make the payment." Foreclosure and even bankruptcy are now possibilities, but the park could still find investors and reopen, according to attorney Allen Jeffcoat. Court documents filed April 13, 2010, in federal bankruptcy court in Delaware say a court ruling will create a lien; the next step will likely be a Horry County court action leading to the park's sale. On June 29, 2010, a federal court awarded Tetra $14 million after Freestyle failed to answer the lawsuit. On June 30, 2010, Baker said the park was "aggressively" seeking new investors. Jeffcoat, who had no connection to the case, said Tetra would only be repaid after other creditors who already had claims.

On August 9, 2010, foreclosure proceedings were filed against Freestyle Music Park. Mortgage holder FPI US LLC seeks over $25 million from park owner FPI MB Entertainment LLC. Loan documents identified the general manager of FPI US LLC as Alexey (Alexei in most documents) Sidnev; Sidnev was a former partner in Moscow-based MT Development, an investor in Freestyle Park that had planned a similar park in Europe. Court filings showed FPI US LLC is a division of MT Development. On August 20, FPI MB Entertainment responded to the foreclosure action, admitting the amount of debt is correct and that it cannot pay. Four out of five creditors responding to the foreclosure claimed FPI US and FPI MB were the same company and that FPI US should not have first claim to park assets. FPI MB attorney Nate Fata denied this. In an August 24, 2010, interview, Baker said the park's entire board had resigned, except for one member appointed by Russian investors who would work to sell the park. Baker, who continued to head Baker Leisure Group, believed the park could succeed under new owners.

VenCore Solutions, which leased items such as radios and shelves to Hard Rock Park, continued its agreement with Freestyle Park. On September 8, VenCore, claiming FPI MB owes the company over $1 million was granted the right to repossess the property. FPI MB stated in a letter that VenCore was correct that the property "is currently uninsured and not subject to a hurricane contingency plan."

In December 2011, FPI US which received the property in an August foreclosure auction, filed papers showing it had mortgaged the property for $20 million, money that the company's attorney said was needed for maintenance and other expenses until a sale.  Land for a proposed hotel which was never built was later sold in a foreclosure auction on July 2, 2012.

Three months before the Summer 2012 season, Alain Wizman of Keller Williams, who had been looking for buyers, said Freestyle appeared unlikely to make a return before 2013. However, on April 18, 2013, local Myrtle Beach newspaper My Horry News reported that local Christian nonprofit arts group Abiding Village launched a campaign to generate enough money to buy the former park minus the rides for $10 million and convert the old park into an education and entertainment complex. An official with Freestyle gave the group three weeks to come up with the resources to purchase the land and buildings, according to Abiding Village officials. On May 7 it was announced via The Sun News that with 5 days left Abiding Village had raised only $1 million of the $10 million goal. On May 13, WBTW and WMBF-TV reported the Abiding Village would not call the old theme park home. The group held a yard sale on May 12, 2013, and later that evening the group's website listed the total as $155,789.82. Abiding Village reps said that they were hopeful that they would still be able to buy the land in the future.

Martin Durham, the park's former vice president for entertainment, said many factors led to the park's demise, but the biggest culprit was the recession that hit right as it opened.

On November 12, 2013, local media reported that Freestyle Music Park was trying to sell off many of the rides from the venture. This was despite earlier rumors that Baker had plans to move the Freestyle rides to a park he planned to open in Orlando, Florida. Dozens of the rides were listed for sale with Nashville-based Ital International; exceptions were the Wave Swinger and Balloon Race, previously sold to Seabreeze Amusement Park. On December 20, 2013, The Sun News reported that the 13-acre Family Kingdom Amusement Park had purchased The Magic Bikes and Jump Around Dunebuggies, two interactive family rides which were the right size for the park. In late July 2014, dismantling and removal of the other rides began. As of August 11, 2014, Ital International no longer listed the rides, and it was reported that other rides were being shipped out of the US, possibly to Vietnam. Being taken down was the roller coaster known as The Eagles' Life In The Fast Lane. Other rides from the park already had been sold. As of February 2015, all of the rides had been dismantled.  They were reassembled in Asia Park in Da Nang, Vietnam with the exception of the Led Zeppelin/Time Machine, Maximum RPM!/Round About, and Slippery When Wet/Soakd’ coasters (They were set up, but never operated and were dismantled in 2017). The track has appeared in Ha Long, Vietnam at a new park called Dragon Park Ha Long.  Both parks have the same owner. The ride opened in 2017 under the name Dragon's Run.

On February 20, 2014, The Sun News reported that Medieval Times Dinner & Tournament bought roughly four acres of the park which it used prior to 2008 for its horses to exercise and graze.

Area government officials visited China in February 2016 and reported that investors had plans for a $100 million development on the site.

Sale of former park property
On January 1, 2019, it was reported that the former Hard Rock/Freestyle Music Park property of approximately 125.14 acres as well as several other parcels was sold by FPI US LLC.  to FTPP Bishop Parkway LLC  for $3,545,000. 

On February 26, 2019, it was revealed that former Myrtle Beach Mayor John Rhodes purchased the old park property back on December 28, 2018. Rhodes said that he was not sure of what he wanted to do with the property, saying that only that any development would take advantage of the waterway and that "it will not be another theme park." Rhodes applied for demolition permits but did say some buildings might remain.

On April 6, 2019, John Rhodes, managing partner of the new ownership group, stated that he did not have any immediate plans for the property, and that he was not against selling the property undeveloped. Rhodes stated that he was in no rush to develop the property as there might be others who wanted it more than he did. He did state that he had some ideas for the property, but that he had to find out from his contractor if any of his ideas would work with the existing buildings.

Suspicious fires
On February 17, 2019, fire official were called just before midnight  to the former Hard Rock/Freestyle Music Park for a three-alarm fire. At about 3:00 a.m. the fire was out and investigators were working the scene and the cause of the blaze was not immediately known, but was later deemed suspicious by fire investigators and local police.

On June 30, 2019, a debris/structure fire broke out at the former amusement park and a preliminary investigation by fire officials show that the two separate fires were not "of an accidental ignition." A witness told police that they saw smoke coming from the park and that they saw a group of people leaving the site and was able to provide police with a license number, but nobody has been arrested in connection to the case and police continue to investigate.

On September 6, 2019, at 5:20 a.m., fire officials responded to a reported commercial structure fire, with the fire being in a former ticket booth area near where one of the parks entrances used to be and flames were visible upon arrival, but the fire was under control within about 30 minutes and there were no reported injuries. There currently are no indications that the fire was suspicious, and is currently under investigation.

Redevelopment
On October 10, 2019, it was reported that Horry County received a rezoning application in which the property owner is requesting an update to the Planned Development District and to allow for additional uses on a portion of the site. The 112 acre property is currently zoned for only theme park use and possible uses for the property were to be presented during a planning and zoning workshop on November 7, where leaders would decide on what possible uses will be permitted at the former amusement park. The owner of the land confirmed the future development of the property will not include an amusement park.

On June 24, 2021, it was announced that any chance of the former park site being redeveloped into an amusement area would all but disappear if Horry County officials approved a land use change request for the property. It was expected that the county planning commission would make a recommendation to expand the distribution district on the site to 125 acres, which would eliminate most of the amusement uses at what is now a former $400 million theme park. If the land change was approved, then 27 types of businesses would be allowed on the property ranging from vehicle and equipment maintenance to RV and boat storage or even wholesale and distribution.

On July 9, 2021, it was announced that the following night the Horry County planning commission would approve the expansion of the Planned Development District, but that Horry County council would still need to approve the next step before the project could move forward. There are more than 30 possible uses, but an exact use had not been decided, though the developer indicated willingness to use it for a small packaging site or even using it for something transportation related.

On February 1, 2022, it was reported that a permit application for a FedEx distribution facility at the site of the former parks was being reviewed by Horry County government officials. A commercial permit application for an approximately 250,000-square-foot facility was filed the previous month and followed a stormwater permit application for part of the property that was filed in December on behalf of Beach Ford RV. On October 4, 2022, it was announced that FedEx is planning to invest  nearly $64 million investment on the property that was once the theme park. In return for the investment FedEx would get a deduction in its property tax rate, only paying on 6% of its assessed value rather than 10.5% for the next 20 years, according to an agreement that was released by county officials on Oct. 4.

Attractions

Roller coasters

Other attractions
{| class="wikitable plainrowheaders"
|-
! scope="col" style="width:30%;background-color:#666;color:#FFF;" colspan="2" | Hard Rock Park !! scope="col" colspan="2" style="width:30%;background-color:#666;color:#FFF;" | Freestyle Music Park !! rowspan="2" scope="col" style="width:15%;background-color:#666;color:#FFF;" | Manufacturer !! rowspan="2" scope="col" style="width:15%;background-color:#666;color:#FFF;" | Type !! rowspan="2" scope="col" style="background-color:#666;color:#FFF;width:10%" | Status !! rowspan="2" scope="col" class="unsortable" style="background-color:#666;color:#FFF;width:5%" | Ref(s)
|-
! scope="col" style="width:17%;background-color:#666;color:#FFF;" | Name !! scope="col" style="width:13%;background-color:#666;color:#FFF;" | Area !! scope="col" style="width:17%;background-color:#666;color:#FFF;" | Name !! scope="col" style="width:13%;background-color:#666;color:#FFF;" | Area
|-style="border-bottom:3px solid #999;"
| All the King's Horses Carousel || British Invasion || Carnaby Carousel || Across the Pond || Chance Rides || Grand Carousel || Closed || 
|-style="border-bottom:3px solid #999;"
| Garage Jam || Lost in the 70s || Grunge Station || Across the Pond || Prime Interactives || Ball play area || Closed || 
|-style="border-bottom:3px solid #999;"
| Games || Lost in the 70s || Ring My Bell || Across the Pond ||  || Upcharge attraction || Closed ||
|-style="border-bottom:3px solid #999;"
| Just a Swingin''' || Cool Country || The Texas Swing || Country USA || Bertazzon || Wave Swinger || Relocating to Seabreeze Amusement Park || 
|-style="border-bottom:3px solid #999;"
| Kids Rock! State Park || Born in the USA || Fantasy Harbour State Park || Kids in America || Rope Courses, Inc. || Ropes course || Closed || 
|-style="border-bottom:3px solid #999;"
| London Cab Ride || British Invasion || McGillivray Cab Company || Across the Pond || HUSS Park Attractions || Rodeo (London cabs) || Relocated to Sunworld Danang Wonders ||
|-style="border-bottom:3px solid #999;"
| Magic Mushroom Garden || British Invasion || Faerie Glen || Across the Pond || HUSS Park Attractions || Airboat || Relocated to Sunworld Danang Wonders ||
|-
| colspan="8" style="background-color:#FFF;border-bottom:3px solid #999;font-size:90%" | A Scrambler-style ride featuring the "World's largest blacklight poster."
|-style="border-bottom:3px solid #999;"
| Muddin' Monster Race || Cool Country || Big Ol' Trucks || Country USA || HUSS Park Attractions || Bee Bee || Relocated to Sunworld Danang Wonders ||
|-
| Nights in White Satin: The Trip || British Invasion || Monstars of Rock || Across the Pond || Sally Corp. / ETF || Dark ride || Closed || 
|-
| colspan="8" style="background-color:#FFF;border-bottom:3px solid #999;font-size:90%" | Was a dark ride based on The Moody Blues' "Nights in White Satin". The ride incorporated sights, sounds, smells and tactile effects, onboard ride vehicle audio, a purpose-made movie written to the spoken word section of the song, and a re-orchestrated version of the iconic song by Justin Hayward.  Guests entered through a bead curtain and wore chroma-depth 3-D glasses during the ride. Nights was voted in the top three new attractions of 2008 in a themeparkinsider.com annual poll.
|-style="border-bottom:3px solid #999;"
| Pinball Wizard Arcade || Lost in the 70s || Who's Tommy Arcade || Across the Pond ||  || Arcade || Closed ||
|-style="border-bottom:3px solid #999;"
| The Punk Pit || Born in the USA || Jump || Across the Pond ||  || Bounce house || Closed ||
|-style="border-bottom:3px solid #999;"
| Reggae River Falls || Rock & Roll Heaven || Polly Nesian's Splash Bash || Myrtle's Beach ||  || Water play area || Closed || 
|-style="border-bottom:3px solid #999;"
| Sole Train || Born in the USA || Cuckoo-Ka-ChooChoo || Kids in America || Zamperla || Rio Grande || Closed || 
|-style="border-bottom:3px solid #999;"
| colspan="2"  || Fly Like An Eagle || Kids in America || Zamperla || Kite Flyer || Closed || 
|-style="border-bottom:3px solid #999;"
| colspan="2"  || Get Off Of My Cloud || Kids in America || Zamperla || Balloon Race || Relocating to Seabreeze Amusement Park || 
|-style="border-bottom:3px solid #999;"
| colspan="2"  || Kids' Tree House || Kids in America || Henderson || Treehouse playground || Closed || 
|-style="border-bottom:3px solid #999;"
| colspan="2"  || Life Is A Highway || Kids in America || Zamperla || Convoy || Closed || 
|}

Shows

Flip 5 Live!-Stars Theatre-Kids In America
This was "a high energy, interactive show that rocked the house." The 11 characters were named Kira, Kimmy, Dot, Spin, Chase, Bounce, Trip, Jive, Jam, Cali and Zach. They sang original and cover songs from the past and present.

In media
On October 26, 2010, the book Grand Strand by former park employee Reid Barwick, became available for purchase online. Many of the details of the fictional "Rocktime Amusement Park" match those of the real story of Hard Rock and Freestyle Music Parks. However, the book contains fraudulent deals which Baker denies took place.

The park was used as a set on an episode of the TV series Revolution''. Several rides and the park itself was used as the scene of a post-apocalyptic amusement park.

References

External links 
 
 Freestyle Music Park on Modern Day Ruins
 Freestyle Music Park on ScreamScape
 Hard Rock Park Photo Gallery
 2013 podcast with developer Jon Binkowski

Amusement parks in South Carolina
Buildings and structures in Myrtle Beach, South Carolina
2008 establishments in South Carolina
Tourist attractions in Myrtle Beach, South Carolina
Companies that have filed for Chapter 7 bankruptcy
Companies that filed for Chapter 11 bankruptcy in 2008
2009 disestablishments in South Carolina
Defunct amusement parks in the United States
Amusement parks closed in 2009
Amusement parks opened in 2008
Modern ruins